Edith Hemenway (Edith Fitz, Boston, 23 December 1926-) is an American composer and pianist.

Recordings
Edith Hemenway - To Paradise for Onions / Songs and Chamber Works - Doors (2010) - Questions of Travel (1999, arr. 2007) - To Paradise for Onions (2001) - A Child's Garden of Verses (1984) - Asian Figures (1979) - Four Poems of Langston Hughes (± 1980-1985) Claron McFadden and Roberta Alexander,  Nancy Braithwaite, Michael Stirling, Vaughan Schlepp  Et'cetera KTC 1632  72'   (2018)

References

Living people
1926 births
American women composers
20th-century American composers
21st-century American composers
20th-century American pianists
21st-century American pianists
20th-century American women pianists
21st-century American women pianists
Musicians from Boston
20th-century women composers
21st-century women composers